Martin Poleť (born 31 August 1990) is a Slovak footballer who plays as a defender for MŠK Rimavská Sobota, on loan from MŠK Žilina and the Slovakia national under-21 football team.

External links
MŠK Žilina profile

1990 births
Living people
People from Žilina District
Sportspeople from the Žilina Region
Association football fullbacks
Slovak footballers
MŠK Žilina players
Slovak Super Liga players
FK Bodva Moldava nad Bodvou players
MŠK Rimavská Sobota players